Local nature reserves are designated by local authorities under the National Parks and Access to the Countryside Act 1949. The local authority must have a legal control over the site, by owning or leasing it or having an agreement with the owner. Local nature reserves are sites which have a special local interest either biologically or geologically. Local authorities have a duty to care for them, and can apply local bye-laws to manage and protect them.

As of January 2019, there are forty-four local nature reserves in Surrey. Fourteen sites are Sites of Special Scientific Interest, five are Special Protection Areas, three are Special Areas of Conservation, one is listed on the Register of Historic Parks and Gardens, one is a Nature Conservation Review site and one is a Geological Conservation Review site. Two sites are scheduled monuments and fourteen are managed by the Surrey Wildlife Trust.

Surrey is a county in South East England. It is bordered by Greater London, Kent, East Sussex, West Sussex, Hampshire and Berkshire. Its top level of government is provided by Surrey County Council and the lower level by eleven boroughs and districts, Elmbridge, Epsom and Ewell, Guildford, Mole Valley, Reigate and Banstead, Runnymede, Spelthorne, Surrey Heath, Tandridge, Waverley and Woking.

Other classifications

GCR = Geological Conservation Review site
NCR = Nature Conservation Review site
RHPG = Register of Historic Parks and Gardens of Special Historic Interest in England
SAC = Special Area of Conservation

SM = Scheduled Monument
SPA = Special Protection Area under the European Union Directive on the Conservation of Wild Birds
 SSSI = Site of Special Scientific Interest
SWT = Surrey Wildlife Trust

Sites

See also
List of Sites of Special Scientific Interest in Surrey

Notes

References

Sources

Surrey
Surrey